Ploesoma is a genus of rotifers belonging to the family Synchaetidae.

The species of this genus are found in Europe and Northern America.

Species:
 Ploesoma africanum Wulfert, 1965 
 Ploesoma hudsoni (Imhof, 1891)

References

Ploima